The Victoria's Secret Fashion Show is an annual fashion show sponsored by Victoria's Secret, a brand of lingerie and sleepwear. Victoria's Secret uses the show to promote and market its goods in high-profile settings.  The show features some of the world's leading fashion models, such as current Victoria's Secret Angels Heidi Klum, Adriana Lima, Alessandra Ambrosio, Karolina Kurkova, Selita Ebanks, Izabel Goulart, Marisa Miller, and Miranda Kerr.

The 12th fashion show featured some of the new Angels and also the returning Angels. There were special performances by will.i.am, Seal, Heidi Klum, and the Spice Girls, and the show was hosted by Heidi Klum.

Fashion show segments

Segment 1: Blade Runner

Segment 2: Age Of Elegance

Segment 3: Think Pink

Segment 4: Rome Antique

Segment 5: Sureally Sexy

Segment 6: Deck the Halls

Finale 

Ingūna Butāne led the finale and models of only last section walked the finale , rest were displayed on giant rotating Christmas tree .

Index

External links 

 VSFS 2007 Gallery
 The Victoria's Secret Fashion Show 2007 on YouTube

Victoria's Secret
2007 in fashion